In algebraic geometry, a normally flat ring along a proper ideal I is a local ring A such that  is flat over  for each integer .

The notion was introduced by Hironaka in his proof of the resolution of singularities as a refinement of equimultiplicity and was later generalized by Alexander Grothendieck and others.

References 

Herrmann, M., S. Ikeda, and U. Orbanz: Equimultiplicity and Blowing Up. An Algebraic Study with an Appendix by B. Moonen. Springer Verlag, Berlin Heidelberg New-York, 1988.

Algebraic geometry